Sir Philip Parker-a-Morley-Long, 3rd Baronet (1682 – 20 January 1741) was an English politician who sat in the House of Commons for Harwich from 1715 to 1734.

Early life
Parker was born at Arwarton, Suffolk, the son of Sir Philip Parker, 2nd Baronet, and Mary Fortrey, daughter of Samuel Fortrey.

Career

In 1710 he took the name of Long on inheriting the estate of Whaddon in Wiltshire from his great-uncle Sir Walter Long. The original Coat of Long was, through some error, allowed to him by the College of Arms. He successfully stood for parliament in the 1715 general election being returned as Member of Parliament (MP) for Harwich. He held the seat until 1734.

In 1740 he founded the Erwarton Almshouses close to his home in Erwarton.

Family
On 11 July 1715 Parker married in London, Martha East and they had four daughters:
Martha (1716–1775) married John Thynne Howe, 2nd Baron Chedworth
Elizabeth (1717–1757)
Katherine (b. 1719)
Dyonisia (b. 1722)

Death
On 20 January 1741, John Perceval, 1st Earl of Egmont wrote in his diary: 
"This morning died my brother-in-law Sir Philip Parker, at 3 o'clock, choked by one of those fits he has had for 12 weeks past at sundry times."

References

Further reading 
Inheriting the Earth: The Long Family's 500 Year Reign in Wiltshire; Cheryl Nicol

1682 births
1741 deaths
Baronets in the Baronetage of England
Members of the Parliament of Great Britain for English constituencies
Long family of Wiltshire
British MPs 1715–1722
British MPs 1722–1727
British MPs 1727–1734